90th Regiment or 90th Infantry Regiment may refer to:

 90th Regiment of Foot (Yorkshire Volunteers), a unit of the British Army, 1779-1784
 90th Regiment of Foot (Perthshire Volunteers), a unit of the British Army
 90th Armoured Regiment (India), a unit of the Indian Army
 Royal Winnipeg Rifles, was first raised as the 90th Winnipeg Battalion of Rifles in 1883
 90th Infantry Regiment (United States), a unit of the United States Army

American Civil War 
 90th Illinois Volunteer Infantry Regiment, a unit of the Union (North) Army during the American Civil War 
 90th New York Volunteer Infantry Regiment, a unit of the Union (Northern) Army 
 90th Ohio Infantry, a unit of the Union (Northern) Army 
 90th Pennsylvania Infantry, a unit of the Union (Northern) Army

See also
 90th Division (disambiguation)
 90 Squadron (disambiguation)